Mituo District is a rural district of Kaohsiung City in southern Taiwan.

History

This district was formerly called Bilokang

Republic of China

After the handover of Taiwan from Japan to the Republic of China in 1945, Mituo was organized as a rural township of Kaohsiung County. On 25 December 2010, Kaohsiung County was merged with Kaohsiung City and Mituo was upgraded to a district of the city.

Administrative divisions
The district consists of Guanghe, Mijing, Miren, Mishou, Mituo, Jiugang, Wenan, Yancheng, Guogang, Haiwei, Tade and Nanliao Village.

Politics
The district is part of Kaohsiung City Constituency II electoral district for Legislative Yuan.

Tourist attractions
 Mi-shou Temple (彌壽宮)
 Mituo Coastal Recreation Area
 Mituo Gold Coast
 Mituo Park
 Nanliao Fishing Harbor
 Nanliao Seaside Lightspot
 Wu Family Swallow Tail Old House

Notable natives
 Tu Cheng-sheng, Minister of Education (2004-2008)

See also
 Kaohsiung

References

External links

 

Districts of Kaohsiung